Johan Runesson (born 20 November 1990) is a Swedish orienteering competitor and World and Junior World Champion.

Runesson competed at the 2008  Junior World Orienteering Championships in Gothenburg, where he won a gold medal in the middle distance, a silver medal in the sprint, and a gold medal in the long distance, as well as participating on the winning Swedish relay team.

He competed at the 2012 World Orienteering Championships. In the middle distance he qualified for the final, where he placed 18th. At the 2019 World Orienteering Championships he participated in the winning Swedish relay team.

Since June 2011 he lives in Gothenburg. Before he lived in Örebro.

References

External links

1990 births
Living people
Swedish orienteers
Male orienteers
Foot orienteers
Junior World Orienteering Championships medalists